Streptomyces avicenniae is a bacterium species from the genus of Streptomyces which has been isolated from the rhizosphere of the plant Avicennia marina in the Fujian Province in China.

See also 
 List of Streptomyces species

References

Further reading

External links
Type strain of Streptomyces avicenniae at BacDive -  the Bacterial Diversity Metadatabase

avicenniae
Bacteria described in 2009